Waylla Hirka (Quechua waylla meadow, Ancash Quechua hirka mountain, "meadow mountain", Hispanicized spelling Huayllajirca) is a mountain in the Andes of Peru, about  high. It is located in the Lima Region, Cajatambo Province, Cajatambo District. Waylla Hirka lies at the Pumarinri valley south of the Waywash mountain range, southwest of Pukaqaqa and north of Millpu. The lakes Quyllurqucha, Warmiqucha (Quechua for "woman lake", Huarmicocha) and Challwaqucha ("fish lake", Challhuacocha) lie northeast of Waylla Hirka.

References

Mountains of Peru
Mountains of Lima Region